Harold Edwin 'Harry' Flower (30 October 1900 − 6 September 1970) was an Australian WWII veteran, a prisoner of war and a 1920s rugby league player in the New South Wales premiership competition with St. George.

Background
Flower was born in Newtown, New South Wales on 30 October 1900.

Playing career
Flower learnt to play rugby league at a young age and was also a great runner, running marathons with the Redfern and St. George Harriers clubs. Originally a South Sydney junior and prop-forward, Flower played eight seasons with St. George during their foundation years between 1922 and 1930. 

He scored a try in the infamous Earl Park Riot match in 1928. His last game was the 1930 Grand Final against Western Suburbs.

His brother Jim Flower also played with the St. George Dragons.

War service
Flower enlisted in the Australian Army as a 40-year-old during World War II and attained the rank of lance corporal. He was captured and held by the Japanese as a prisoner of war, and survived. His 19-year-old son (Harry Edwin Flower junior) also served in the Australian Army and survived the war.

Death
Flower died on 6 September 1970, 54 days short of his 70th birthday.

References

St. George Dragons players
Australian rugby league players
1900 births
1970 deaths
Australian Army personnel of World War II
New South Wales rugby league team players
Rugby league props
Rugby league locks
Rugby league second-rows
Rugby league players from Sydney
Australian Army soldiers
Australian prisoners of war
World War II prisoners of war held by Japan